Walter Jobson (by 1519 – alive in December 1605), of London and Kingston upon Hull, Yorkshire, was an English politician.

Family
On 29 August 1540, Jobson married Elizabeth, the widow of William Page of London. Together they had at least one son.

Career
Jobson was Mayor of Kingston upon Hull from 1549 to 1550, and again from 1556 to 1557.

He was a Member (MP) of the Parliament of England for Kingston upon Hull in 1547, November 1554, 1555, 1558 and 1559.

References

1605 deaths
Politicians from Kingston upon Hull
Mayors of Kingston upon Hull
Year of birth uncertain
English MPs 1547–1552
English MPs 1554–1555
English MPs 1555
English MPs 1558
English MPs 1559